Kutzenhausen is a municipality in Augsburg district, Bavaria in Germany.

References

Augsburg (district)